XS Latin is a formation dance team based in Cambridge, UK. 
It is ranked 1st in the UK and 11th in the World as a Latin Formation Team.

Creation 
XS Latin was formed in 1997 by eX Students of Cambridge University, many of whom started dancing in competitions run by the Inter Varsity Dance Association. They have represented the UK in WDSF World Latin Formation competitions since 2002.

The team continues to be based in the Cambridge area (practising in the nearby village of Milton) and is one of only five Adult Latin formation teams competing in the UK.

In 2011, XS Latin opened a B Team, also based in Cambridge (practising in Cottenham).
XS Latin is sponsored by Capezio.

Routines and results 
Titles refer to themes and music that the routines were based around. Blackpool refers to competitions run as part of Blackpool Dance Festival (previously referred to British Open and British Closed). Blackpool acts as the national selection competition as only two English teams can be sent to the World Championships.

Sarafina, the team was coached by Mark Lunn and Louise Lidbury, performed in Blackpool, United Kingdom, 1998-1999 
Mystery was performed in Blackpool, 2000-2001
Moulin Rouge was performed in Blackpool, and at the World Championships Vilnius, Lithuania, 2002-2003
Aladdin was performed in Blackpool and at the IDSF World Championships in Essen, Germany, and in Minsk, Belarus 2003-2004
Tom Jones was performed in Blackpool and at the IDSF World Championships in Munich, Germany, 2005 
Song of South America was performed in Blackpool, at the Donaupokal Invitational Competition Vienna, Austria, and at the IDSF World Championships in Bremen, Germany, 2006
On Broadway was performed in Blackpool and at the Donaupokal Invitational Competition Vienna, IDSF European Championships Düsseldorf and the IDSF World Championships in Bremerhaven (both Germany) 2007
Night Fever was performed in Blackpool and at the IDSF World Championships in Wiener Neustadt, Austria 2008 and in the IDSF World championships in Bremen, Germany 2009
Priscilla was performed in Blackpool, at the IDSF world championships in Moscow 2010 and at the Donaupokal Invitational Competition Vienna.

Bat Out of Hell was performed in Blackpool, at the IDSF world championships in Bremen 2012 and 2013 and at the European Championships in Vilnius 2013.

Current activities 
They dance a six-minute routine that incorporates the five Latin dances - Cha Cha, Jive, Paso Doble, Samba and Rumba - as well as tricks, lifts and free-form choreography.
They are trained by David Mallabone and compete both nationally and internationally.

XS Latin won the British National Championships in  2005, 2006, 2008, 2010, and 2011.
They were placed 14th in the World Formation Championships Nov 2008, 13th in the 2010 World Formation Championships in Moscow 
In 2010 they finished 4th in the Donaupokal Formation International.

Besides competitions XS Latin also give demonstrations and promote formation dance at several open house events.

See also 
 Formation dance
 Ballroom dance
 Competitive dance
 Dance
 Žuvėdra
 Blackpool Dance Festival

References

External links 
XS Latin own website
TSG Bremerhaven Latin Formation Team Germany
International Governing body
Double V Netherlands

Ballroom dance
Dancesport
Formation dance teams
Performing groups established in 1997

de:Formationstanzen
nl:Formatiedans